Tylosis jimenezii is a species of beetle in the family Cerambycidae. It was described by Dugès in 1879.

References

Trachyderini
Beetles described in 1879